Kharakan may refer to:
 Kharakan, Fars
 Kharakan, Qazvin